Scully Terrace is a bold, flat-topped terrace which is triangular in plan and borders the northwest part of Supporters Range between Ranfurly Point and Mount Kinsey, on the east side of upper Beardmore Glacier. Named in 1986 by Advisory Committee on Antarctic Names (US-ACAN) after R. Tucker Scully, Director, Office of Oceans and Polar Affairs, U.S. Department of State, with responsibility for policy and negotiations relative to Antarctic resources, conservation, and the inspection of foreign stations under the Antarctic Treaty.

Terraces of Antarctica
Landforms of the Ross Dependency
Dufek Coast